Therapy is the attempted remediation of a health problem.

Therapy may also refer to:

 Psychotherapy

Literature
Therapy (Fitzek novel), a 2006 novel by Sebastian Fitzek
Therapy (Kellerman novel), a 2004 novel by Jonathan Kellerman
Therapy (Lodge novel), a 1995 novel by David Lodge
Therapy (journal), now Clinical Practice, a medical journal

Music
Therapy?, a metal band from Northern Ireland

Albums
Therapy (Anne-Marie album) or the title song, 2021
Therapy (James Whild Lea album), 2007
Therapy (Loudon Wainwright III album) or the title song, 1989
Therapy (MiChi album) or the title song, 2012
Therapy (Diatribe EP) or the title song, 1991
Therapy (Tech N9ne EP), 2013

Songs
"Therapy" (Armin van Buuren song), 2018
"Therapy" (The Damned song), 1980
"Therapy" (T-Pain song), 2008
"Therapy" (Mary J. Blige song), 2014
"Therapy", by the Alchemist from Chemical Warfare, 2009
"Therapy", by All Time Low from Nothing Personal, 2009
"Therapy", by Axium from Blindsided, 2003
"Therapy", by Brooke Fraser, 2016
"Therapy", by Duke Dumont, 2020
"Therapy", by Heltah Skeltah from Nocturnal, 1996
"Therapy", by India.Arie from Testimony: Vol. 2, Love & Politics, 2009
"Therapy", by Infectious Grooves from The Plague That Makes Your Booty Move... It's the Infectious Grooves, 1991
"Therapy", by Khalid from American Teen, 2017
"Therapy", by Kim Cesarion, 2016
"Therapy", by Relient K from Forget and Not Slow Down, 2009
"Therapy", by Conro 2020

Other uses
Therapy (New York City), a gay bar and nightclub in Manhattan
Therapy (film), a 2021 Cameroonian film
"Therapy" (Roseanne), a 1992 television episode

See also
List of therapies
List of psychotherapies